The Dive Coaster is a steel roller coaster model developed and engineered by Bolliger & Mabillard. The design features one or more near-vertical drops that are approximately 90 degrees, which provide a moment of free-falling for passengers. The experience is enhanced by unique trains that seat up to ten riders per row, spanning only two or three rows total. Unlike traditional train design, this distinguishing aspect gives all passengers virtually the same experience throughout the course of the ride. Another defining characteristic of Dive Coasters is the holding brake at the top of the lift hill that holds the train momentarily right as it enters the first drop, suspending some passengers with a view looking straight down and releasing suddenly moments later.

Development of the Dive Coaster began between 1994 and 1995 with Oblivion at Alton Towers opening on March 14, 1998, making it the world's first Dive Coaster. The trains for this type of coaster are relatively short consisting of two to three cars. B&M also uses floorless trains on this model to enhance the experience. As of July 30, 2022, sixteen Dive Coasters have been built, with the newest being Dr. Diabolical's Cliffhanger at Six Flags Fiesta Texas.

History

According to Walter Bolliger, development of the Dive Coaster began between 1994 and 1995. On March 14, 1998, the world's first Dive Coaster, Oblivion, opened at Alton Towers. Though Oblivion is classified as a Dive Coaster, it does not have a true vertical drop as the drop angle is 87-degrees. Two years later, the second Dive Coaster built, Diving Machine G5, opened at Janfusun Fancyworld and also does not have a vertical drop. In 2005, SheiKra opened at Busch Gardens Tampa Bay and was the first Dive Coaster to feature a 90-degree drop and a splashdown element. In 2007, Busch Gardens Williamsburg announced that Griffon would be the first ever Dive Coaster to feature floorless trains and SheiKra would have its trains replaced with floorless ones. In 2011, the first 'mini' Dive Coaster opened at Heide Park Resort, named Krake. Unlike other Dive Coasters, Krake has smaller trains consisting of three rows of six riders.  In 2019, Yukon Striker at Canada's Wonderland was the first Dive Coaster to feature a vertical loop, allowing it to have the most inversions on a Dive Coaster with four in total. On July 30 2022, Dr. Diabolical’s Cliffhanger at Six Flags Fiesta Texas is the first B&M Dive Coaster to feature a beyond vertical (95°) drop and 7-across seating.

Design

The design of a Dive Coaster can vary slightly from one to another. Depending on the amusement park's request, one row on the train can seat anywhere from 6 to 10 riders. Stadium seating is also used to give every rider a clear view. Next, compared to standard Bolliger & Mabillard 4 abreast cars, because of the extra weight of each train on a Dive Coaster, the size of the track must be larger than other B&M models (such as the Hyper Coaster) to support the weight. At the top of the primary vertical drop, a braking system holds the train for 3 to 5 seconds, giving riders a view of the drop ahead before being released into the drop.

In the station, Dive Coasters that use non-floorless trains simply use a standard station. With Dive Coasters that use floorless trains, in order to allow riders to load and unload the train, a movable floor is necessary. Because the front row has nothing in front of it to stop riders from walking over the edge of the station, a gate is placed in front of the train to prevent this from happening. Once all the over-the-shoulder restraints are locked, the gate opens and the floor separates into several pieces and moves underneath the station. When the next train enters the station, the gate is closed and the floors are brought back up where the next riders board.

Installations 
Bolliger & Mabillard has built fourteen Dive Coasters with one to be opened in 2020-2021. The roller coasters are listed in order of opening dates.

Similar coasters
HangTime, a Gerstlauer roller coaster located at Knott's Berry Farm in Buena Park, California, has been marketed as "the first dive coaster on the West Coast".

In 2018, Golden Horse, a Chinese amusement ride manufacturer infamous for creating knock-off coasters and rides, installed a Dive Coaster at Great Xingdong Tourist World. The trains contain four cars, each seating 6 riders per row, compared to B&M dive coasters, which have two or three cars per train.

See also
 Floorless Coaster, a type of roller coaster also designed by Bolliger & Mabillard, that features floorless trains.

References

External links 

Types of roller coaster